Sups is a rural locality (a settlement) in Takhtamukayskoye Rural Settlement of Takhtamukaysky District, the Republic of Adygea, Russia. The population was 70 as of 2018. There are 3 streets.

Geography 
Sups is located 5 km east of Takhtamukay (the district's administrative centre) by road. Enem is the nearest rural locality.

References 

Rural localities in Takhtamukaysky District